The phreatic zone, saturated zone, or zone of saturation, is the part of an aquifer, below the water table, in which relatively all pores and fractures are saturated with water.  Above the water table is the unsaturated or vadose zone.

The phreatic zone size, color, and depth may fluctuate with changes of season, and during wet and dry periods.<ref
></ref
><ref
></ref
>    Depending on the characteristics of soil particles, their packing and porosity, the boundary of a saturated zone can be stable or instable, exhibiting fingering patterns known as Saffman–Taylor instability. Predicting the onset of stable vs. unstable drainage fronts is of some importance in modelling phreatic zone boundaries.<ref
>    Dynamics of Drainage and Viscous Fingering
     in Transport in Porous Media
     
     Note that zones "behind" the drainage front are areas on the 'dry' (low-viscosity) (typically above / beyond the 'wet' zone).
</ref
>

See also

 
 
 
 
 
 
 Index: Aquifer articles

References

Aquifers
Cave geology
Hydrogeology
Soil physics